Dahlia campanulata, the weeping tree dahlia, is a species of flowering plant in the family Asteraceae, native to Guerrero and Oaxaca states, Mexico. It is available from commercial suppliers.

References

campanulata
Garden plants of North America
Endemic flora of Mexico
Flora of Southwestern Mexico
Plants described in 2003